Qbajjar Bay is a small bay near Marsalforn, in the limits of Żebbuġ on the island of Gozo, Malta, this small bay is part of Marsalforn. It is located between Xwejni Bay to the west, and Marsalforn Bay to the east. The 18th century, Qolla l-Bajda Battery, one of the few surviving coastal fortifications in Gozo, is located between Qbajjar and Xwejni, on a promontory known as il-Ponta tat-Torri. The Bay, also has a few salt pans, where locals collect salt.

History

The Qolla Il-Bajda Battery 

The Qolla l-Bajda Battery, also known as the Qbajjar Battery, is one of the many defensive structures built in the Hospitaller period, and continued to be used by Britain in World War I and World War II. When it was originally built, it was made up of two blockhouses, a gun platform, a parapet and a small ditch.

These enabled it to provide defense to invading forces. The blockhouses had small gun-holes, in case of an attack from land. Now, this historic monument lies abandoned.

The "Qolliet" 
The two Hillocks, are one of the most visible geographical features in Marsalforn. One being in the yellowish color and the other in whitish. These translate to qolla is-safra (the yellow hillock) and the qolla il-bajda (the white hillock). The battery's name comes from the white hillock as they are within  of each other.

List of locations 
 The Qolla il-Bajda Battery
 Some apartments for rent
 A few Saltpans
 Some restaurants 
 The bay itself.
 Some residential buildings surrounding the bay. 
 Some Diving locations
Qolla Il-Bajda
Qolla Is-Safra

References 

Bays of Malta
Żebbuġ, Gozo